The 2011 Hong Kong–Shanghai Inter Club Championship was held on 5 November and 12 November 2011. The first leg was played at Mong Kok Stadium, Hong Kong, with the second leg taken place at Yuanshen Sports Centre Stadium, Shanghai.

Wofoo Tai Po was selected to represent Hong Kong due to a better league position (5th) in the previous season than the other applicant Citizen (6th).

The second leg in Shanghai is also named as 2011 Dongping National Forest Park Cup after sponsorship from Shanghai Cong Ming Travel.

Squads

Shanghai East Asia
 Chairman: Xu Genbao
 Coaches: Xu Zubao, Jiang Bingyao, Bian Genxi, Zhang Guanxing
 Physio: Sun Guozhu

Wofoo Tai Po

Match details

First leg

Second leg

References

2011–12 in Hong Kong football
Hong Kong–Shanghai Inter Club Championship